Marlisa is the self-titled debut studio album by Australian singer Marlisa Punzalan, released after she won the sixth season of The X Factor Australia, through Sony Music Australia on 7 November 2014. The album peaked at number two on the ARIA Singles Chart. The album was certified Gold by the Australian Recording Industry Association for shipments of more than 35,000 copies and was the 83rd best-selling album of 2014 in Australia. The album features her lead single "Stand by You" and re-recorded studio tracks of some of the songs she performed on the show.

Commercial performance
Marlisa debuted at number two on the ARIA Albums Chart and was certified Platinum by the Australian Recording Industry Association for sales exceeding 70,000 copies.

Track listing

Charts

Weekly charts

Year-end charts

Certifications

References

2014 albums
Sony Music Australia albums